Quia maior is a papal bull issued by Pope Innocent III in April 1213 calling for the Fifth Crusade. It was sent to nearly all the ecclesiastical provinces in Europe.

Innocent claimed that the Crusade offered an opportunity for salvation: "[H]ow many, converted to penitence, have handed themselves over by service of the Crucified for the liberation of the Holy Land, as is by suffering martyrdom they have obtained the crown of glory, who would perhaps have perished in their iniquities entangled in carnal desires and earthly seductions. This is an old device of Jesus Christ that he deigned to renew in these days for the salvation of his faithful". Innocent then called for a new crusade:

Thus the King of kings, our Lord Jesus Christ, who brought body and soul and other goods to you, will condemn you for the vice of ingratitude and the crime of infidelity if you should fail to aid him with the result that he lost his kingdom that he brought with the price of his blood. Know then that whoever denies aid to the Redeemer in this time of his need is culpably harsh and harshly culpable. For, also, insofar as, according to the divine command, he loves his neighbor as himself and for him, he knows that this brethren in faith and in the Christian name are imprisoned by the faithless Saracens in a cruel prison and endure the harsh yoke of slavery, he does not expend the efficacious work for their liberation, that the Lord spoke of in the Gospel. "Do to others whatever you wish them to do to you". Or perhaps you do not know that many thousands of Christians are held in prison and slavery by them and they suffer countless torments?

Innocent continued:

...the Christian people possessed almost all the Saracen provinces until after the time of Saint Gregory. But after that time, a certain son of perdition, the pseudo-prophet Muhammad, arose, and he seduced many away from the truth with carnal enticements and pleasures. Even though his perfidy lasted until the present, still we trust in the Lord who has now made a good sign that the end of this beast, whose number, according to John's Apocalypse, counts 666, of which now almost six hundred years are completed approaches. ... Therefore, dearly beloved sons, changing dissensions and fratricidal jealousies into treaties of peace and goodwill, let us gird ourselves to come to the aid of the Crucified, not hesitating to risk property and life for him who laid down his life and shed his blood for us.

Innocent also promised the remission of sins to those who took part in the Crusade, to those who supplied men at their expense and to those who donated money towards it. From the document, the remission of sins can be seen as also dependent on a "truthful oral confession with contrite hearts".

The bull also included a prayer for the liberation of the Holy Land through crusade, the Deus qui admirabili.

Notes

13th-century papal bulls
Documents of Pope Innocent III
Fifth Crusade